Line 24 will be a future subway line on the Shanghai Metro. The line was announced by the Municipal government in 2016.
 It will run in a north–south direction through Pudong and connect the Huangpu River bank in Yangpu District with the Shanghai Science and Technology Museum. It will form a ring around the Middle Ring Road together with Line 20 and Line 22.

Stations

Service routes

References

Shanghai Metro lines
Proposed buildings and structures in Shanghai
Shanghai